The Ophir Awards, colloquially known as the Israeli Oscars or the Israeli Academy Awards, are film awards for excellence in the Israeli film industry awarded by the Israeli Academy of Film and Television. The award, named after Israeli actor Shaike Ophir, has been granted since 1990.

History
The first Israeli Academy Awards ceremony was held in 1982 with the first award being presented to director Shimon Dotan for the film Repeat Dive, and since 1990 has been held annually at the Tel Aviv Performing Arts Center.

The highest number of Ophir Awards won by a single film is 11, achieved only by Nina's Tragedies. Assi Dayan won the award 8 times and is the only person to have won as a director, as a screenwriter and also as an actor.

The winner of the Best Film award usually becomes Israel's submission for the Academy Award for Best International Feature Film, although exceptions include Aviva My Love (which was rejected in favor of the film it tied with, Sweet Mud) and The Band's Visit, which was disqualified for having more than 50% of its dialogue in English. Israel submitted the runner-up for that year—Beaufort—instead. The latter film was eventually nominated for the Academy Award for Best International Feature Film.

The statuette awarded to prize winners was designed by the Israeli sculptor Richard Shiloh, who was killed in a motorcycle accident in 2011.

List of winners
 1990: The Lookout (Shuroo)
 1991: Beyond the Sea 
 1992: Life According to Agfa
 1993: Revenge of Itzik Finkelstein
 1994: Sh'Chur
 1995: Lovesick on Nana Street
 1996: Saint Clara
 1997: Pick a Card
 1998: Circus Palestine
 1999: Yana's Friends
 2000: Time of Favor
 2001: Late Marriage
 2002: Broken Wings
 2003: Nina's Tragedies
 2004: Campfire
 2005: What a Wonderful Place
 2006: Aviva, My Love and Sweet Mud
 2007: The Band's Visit
 2008: Waltz with Bashir
 2009: Ajami
 2010: The Human Resources Manager
 2011: Footnote
 2012: Fill the Void
 2013: Bethlehem
 2014: Gett: The Trial of Viviane Amsalem
 2015: Baba Joon
 2016: Sand Storm
 2017: Foxtrot
 2018: The Cakemaker
 2019: Incitement
 2020: Asia
 2021: Let There Be Morning
 2022: Cinema Sabaya

Awards ceremonies

This is a list of Ophir Award ceremonies.

Ceremonies

Ceremony hosts 

The following have hosted (or co-hosted) the Academy Awards ceremony on two or more occasions.

See also
 Cinema of Israel
 Israeli Academy of Film and Television
 List of Israeli submissions for the Academy Award for Best International Feature Film
 Awards of the Israeli Television Academy

References

External links

Official site of the Israeli Film and Television Academy
Awards of the Israeli Film Academy on IMDb

Israeli film awards
Awards established in 1982
1982 establishments in Israel